Al-Amarinah is a sub-district located in Al Udayn District, Ibb Governorate, Yemen. Al-Amarinah had a population of 3201 as of 2004.

References 

Sub-districts in Al Udayn District